Chengxi railway station is a railway station on the Hainan eastern ring high-speed railway, serving the Chengxi township, located in Hainan, People's Republic of China. The station is opened on July 1, 2019.

References

Railway stations in Hainan
Railway stations in China opened in 2019